Liobagrus is a genus of catfishes of the family Amblycipitidae. Liobagrus fishes are distributed in the Yangtze River basin, Taiwan, Japan, and the Korea Peninsula. The adipose fin of these fishes is a confluent with the caudal fin. The nostrils are far apart, unlike those found in Amblyceps. Most Liobagrus species grow to about 100 millimetres (3.94 in) SL.

Taxonomy
No shared derived characteristic has been found to diagnose the genus Liobagrus. However, it is maintained that this genus is currently monophyletic. Liobagrus has been placed in the family Bagridae. Later, it was found to more closely resemble Amblyceps, and was transferred to Amblycipitidae.

Xiurenbagrus was erected because Liobagrus would not be monophyletic with Liobagrus xiurenensis, now Xiurenbagrus xiurenensis. The genera Amblyceps and Liobagrus are sister group pair that is, in turn, sister to Xiurenbagrus.

Species
There are currently 15 recognized species in this genus:
 Liobagrus aequilabris J. J. Wright & H. H. Ng, 2008
 Liobagrus andersoni Regan, 1908
 Liobagrus anguillicauda Nichols, 1926
 Liobagrus chenghaiensis Z. W. Sun, S. J. Ren & E. Zhang, 2013 
 Liobagrus formosanus Regan, 1908
 Liobagrus hyeongsanensis S. H. Kim, H. S. Kim & J. Y. Park, 2015 
 Liobagrus kingi T. L. Tchang, 1935
 Liobagrus marginatoides (H. W. Wu, 1930)
 Liobagrus marginatus (Günther, 1892)
 Liobagrus mediadiposalis T. Mori, 1936
 Liobagrus nigricauda Regan, 1904
 Liobagrus obesus Y. M. Son, I. S. Kim & I. Y. Choo, 1987 (Bull-head torrent catfish)
 Liobagrus reinii Hilgendorf, 1878
 Liobagrus somjinensis J. Y. Park & S. H. Kim, 2010
 Liobagrus styani Regan, 1908

References

 
Amblycipitidae
Fish of Asia
Catfish genera
Taxa named by Franz Martin Hilgendorf
Freshwater fish genera